Bernard Campan (born 4 April 1958, in Agen) is a French actor, film director and writer. He is a member of Les Inconnus trio of humorists. He won a César Award for Best Debut for Les Trois Frères, and was nominated for best actor for his role in Se souvenir des belles choses.

Theatre

Filmography

External links

 

1958 births
Living people
People from Agen
French humorists
French male film actors
French male television actors
20th-century French male actors
21st-century French male actors
French film directors
French male screenwriters
French screenwriters